Ashu Lal Faqeer (birth name Muhammad Ashraf; born 13 April 1959), is a Saraiki-language poet from Karor Lal Esan, Pakistan.Ashu Lal Faqeer is MBBS from Quaid-e-Azam Medical College.

Books
He has published books of poetry:
Chairroo Hath Nah Wanjli (The Shepherd without a Flute) چارو ہتھ نہ ونجلی 
Gautam Naal Jhairra (Arguments with Gautam) 1995
Kaan Wassu Da Pakhi Aey (Crow is Bird of Human Abode) 1997
Sindh Sagar Naal Hameshaan (Always with River Sindh) 2002
Jaal Maloti (A Meeting Place)
and two collections of short stories, Abnormal and Bairri (Boat).

Awards
He was awarded Kamal-e-Fun, the top literary award from the Pakistan Academy of Letters but he refused to accept it.

See also
 Shakir Shuja Abadi

References

1959 births
Saraiki-language poets
Saraiki people
Living people